In geology,  a palimpsest is a geographical feature composed of superimposed structures created at different times. Palimpsest is beginning to be used by glaciologists to describe contradicting glacial flow indicators, usually consisting of smaller indicators (i.e., striae) overprinted upon larger features (i.e., stoss and lee topography, drumlins, etc.).

The name arises by analogy to a medieval palimpsest, a reused parchment manuscript page in which the previous text can sometimes be deciphered.

See also
Palimpsest (planetary astronomy)
Palimpsest (disambiguation)

Glaciology
Paleogeography